Ravi Varma (born as K Ravi Kumar) is an Indian stunt director.

Early life
Ravi Varma was born on 6 January 1976 to K Kalasaiah and Ningamma in Bangalore, Karnataka. He did his schooling in Bangalore Corporation School. He was once a autorickshaw driver.

Career 
Varma began his journey with Sandalwood in 1995 as a fight assistant. A breakthrough in his movie career happened when he assumed the role of action director in the Kannada film Dharma in 2004, in which the principal actor was Darshan. His biggest Sandalwood movie so far is Darshan's Sangoli Rayanna, an epic period movie filmed on a grand scale with 1000 actors. Ravi Varma entered the Telugu industry with Krishna Vamsi's Mahatma in 2009.

Varma's stunts in the South Indian film industry earned him a break with Prabhu Deva's R... Rajkumar in which Shahid Kapoor played the lead role. He also worked with Salman Khan, Shah Rukh Khan and Ajay Devgn in the films Jai Ho, Raees, and Action Jackson respectively. His prime projects are Doddmane Hudga, Jaguar, Santhu Straight Forward, Dhruva, Rock On!! 2 and Machine.

Awards 
Varma has received many awards from the Kannada and the Telugu film industries. He has been conferred with the title Saahasa Saarvabouma by the Kannada film industry.

Filmography

References

External links
 

Living people
Indian action choreographers
Film directors from Bangalore
21st-century Indian film directors
Year of birth missing (living people)